Louis-Charles Marty (December 30, 1891 – March 19, 1970) was a French gymnast who competed in the 1912 Summer Olympics and in the 1920 Summer Olympics.

In 1912 he finished eleventh in the all-around competition. Eight years later he finished thirteenth in the all-around competition.

References

External links
 List of French gymnasts
 Louis-Charles Marty's profile at Sports Reference.com

People from Sète
1891 births
1970 deaths
French male artistic gymnasts
Olympic gymnasts of France
Gymnasts at the 1912 Summer Olympics
Gymnasts at the 1920 Summer Olympics
Year of death unknown
Sportspeople from Hérault
20th-century French people